The International Mathematical Olympiad (IMO) is an annual international high school mathematics competition focused primarily on pre-collegiate mathematics, and is the oldest of the international science olympiads. The awards for exceptional performance include medals for roughly the top half participants, and honorable mentions for participants who solve at least one problem perfectly.

This is a list of participants who have achieved notability. This includes participants that went on to become notable mathematicians, participants who won medals at an exceptionally young age, or participants who scored highly.

Exceptionally young medalists

High-scoring participants

The following table lists all IMO Winners who have won at least three gold medals, with corresponding years and non-gold medals received noted (P denotes a perfect score.)

Notable participants
A number of IMO participants have gone on to become notable mathematicians. The following IMO participants have either received a Fields Medal, an Abel Prize, a Wolf Prize or a Clay Research Award, awards which recognise groundbreaking research in mathematics; a European Mathematical Society Prize, an award which recognizes young researchers; or one of the American Mathematical Society's awards (a Blumenthal Award in Pure Mathematics, Bôcher Memorial Prize in Analysis, Cole Prize in Algebra, Cole Prize in Number Theory, Fulkerson Prize in Discrete Mathematics, Steele Prize in Mathematics, or Veblen Prize in Geometry and Topology) recognizing research in specific mathematical fields. Grigori Perelman proved the Poincaré conjecture (one of the seven Millennium Prize Problems), and Yuri Matiyasevich gave a negative solution of Hilbert's tenth problem.

G denotes an IMO gold medal, S denotes a silver medal, B denotes a bronze medal, and P denotes a perfect score.

IMO medalists have also gone on to become notable computer scientists. The following IMO medalists have received  a Nevanlinna Prize, a Knuth Prize, or a Gödel Prize; these awards recognise research in theoretical computer science. G denotes an IMO gold medal, S denotes a silver medal, B denotes a bronze medal, and P denotes a perfect score.

See also
Provincial Mathematical Olympiad
List of mathematics competitions
List of International Mathematical Olympiads

Notes

References

External links
General information on the IMO
International Mathematical Olympiad

International Mathematical Olympiad participants